Craig Freer is an Australian former rugby league footballer who played for Parramatta and Balmain.

Freer played for the Burleigh Bears in the 1998 and 1999 winning the Qld cup. Round 22: 15, 16 August

References

1975 births
Living people
Australian rugby league players
Burleigh Bears players
Parramatta Eels players
Balmain Tigers players
Rugby league five-eighths
Rugby league players from Sydney